Chessington South railway station is in the Royal Borough of Kingston upon Thames in Greater London, England, and is the terminus of the Chessington Branch Line. It is the nearest railway station to Chessington World of Adventures and Chessington School.

History
The station was built to a design of Southern Railway architect James Robb Scott and opened on 28 May 1939. However, construction of the line stopped, never to be resumed, upon the outbreak of World War II and the up platform was never used for passenger trains, although the track was used for stabling out of service trains during off-peak times. There was a goods yard beyond the passenger station. After the continuation to Leatherhead was abandoned, part of line south of the station was used from the mid-1960s to the end of the 1980s for a coal concentration depot. The line and the sidings to the coal depot were unused and hidden by trees for many years, but in 2021 the land was cleared and tracks relaid for an aggregates depot.

The ticket office is at track level. There are two automated ticket machine at street level.

In 2019 a ramp was added to the station, providing step-free access to the single platform from street level.

The disused platform is inaccessible, given there is no footbridge connecting the platforms. It remains abandoned as surplus to requirements, as only two trains depart each hour.

Services 
South Western Railway operates all services. The service interval is 30 minutes during both peak and off-peak hours. All trains run to or from London Waterloo, calling at all intermediate stations (except  which has platforms on only the Waterloo-Reading line). The journey to Waterloo takes 37 minutes.

Services typically use Class 455 EMUs, although a Class 450 or Class 707 is used on occasion.Until 2022, Class 456 trains were often attached to Class 455 units to form ten carriage trains, but these were withdrawn on 17 January with the introduction of a new timetable.

Connections
London Buses routes 71 and 467 serve the station during the day, and route N65 at night.

Gallery

References

External links 

Railway stations in the Royal Borough of Kingston upon Thames
Former Southern Railway (UK) stations
Railway stations in Great Britain opened in 1939
Railway stations served by South Western Railway
James Robb Scott buildings